Newtown Oval is a cricket ground in Maryborough, Queensland, Australia.  The first recorded match on the ground came when Maryborough played Victoria on Christmas Day in 1922.  The ground later held its only first-class match in 1994 when Queensland played the touring Zimbabweans, with the match ending in a 4 wicket victory for Queensland.

References

External links
Newtown Oval at ESPNcricinfo
Newtown Oval at CricketArchive

Cricket grounds in Australia
Sports venues in Queensland
Sports venues completed in 1922